John Schroeder may refer to:
 John H. Schroeder, chancellor of University of Wisconsin–Milwaukee from 1991 to 1998
 John Schroeder (golfer), American golfer
 John Schroeder (musician) (1935–2017), British pop and easy listening composer, arranger, songwriter